East Brewton is a city in Escambia County, Alabama, United States. It was incorporated in October 1918. At the 2020 census, the population was 2,293. The community grew around Fort Crawford, a fort built to protect early settlers of the area.

Geography
East Brewton is located in east-central Escambia County at  (31.092408, -87.053174). It is bordered to the northwest by the city of Brewton, across Murder Creek.

U.S. Route 29 and Alabama State Route 41 pass through the center of East Brewton as Forrest Avenue and lead northwest into the center of Brewton. In the other direction, US 29 runs east, then northeast,  to Andalusia, while AL 41 leads south  to the Florida line.

Demographics

As of the census of 2000, there were 2,496 people, 1,043 household, and 688 families residing in the city. The racial makeup of the city was 77.07% White, 10.29% Black or African American, 10.48% Native American, 0.08% Pacific Islander, 1.44% from other races, and 0.64% from two or more races. 1.96% of the population were Hispanic or Latino of any race.

There were 1,043 households, out of which 31.6% had children under the age of 18 living with them, 46.4% were married couples living together, 15.3% had a female householder with no husband present, and 34.0% were non-families. 29.9% of all households were made up of individuals, and 12.2% had someone living alone who was 65 years of age or older. The average household size was 2.39 and the average family size was 2.94.

The median income for a household in the city was $23,125, and the median income for a family was $30,610. Males had a median income of $22,138 versus $12,540 for females. The per capita income for the city was $12,531. About 18.5% of families were above the poverty line, including 36.7% of those under age 18 and 22.0% of those age 65 or over.

2010 census
As of the census of 2010, there were 2,478 people, 992 household, and 661 families residing in the city. The racial makeup of the city was 74.7% White, 20.8% Black or African American, .6% Native American, 0.0% Pacific Islander, 2.6% from other races, and 1.3% from two or more races. 3.1% of the population were Hispanic or Latino of any race.

There were 992 households, out of which 31.0% had children under the age of 18 living with them, 37.6% were married couples living together, 23.6% had a female householder with no husband present, and 33.4% were non-families. 28.5% of all households were made up of individuals, and 12.0% had someone living alone who was 65 years of age or older. The average household size was 2.50 and the average family size was 3.03.

The median income for a household in the city was $26,065, and the median income for a family was $34,120. Males had a median income of $35,833 versus $17,458 for females. The per capita income for the city was $15,181. About 26.4% of families and 29.7% of the population were above the poverty line, including 39.1% of those under age 18 and 13.1% of those age 65 or over.

Education
Escambia County Public School System is the local school district.

References

External links
City of East Brewton official website
Escambia County Industrial Development Authority
Coastal Gateway Regional Economic Development Alliance

Cities in Alabama
Cities in Escambia County, Alabama